The Kommunalny Bridge or The Oktyabrsky Bridge (Kommunalny Most) is an automobile bridge over the Ob River, connecting the Kirovsky, Leninsky and Oktyabrsky districts of Novosibirsk, Russia.

History
Kommunlny Bridge was opened on October 20, 1955. The cost of construction amounted to 128 million rubles.

External links
 Komsomolskaya Pravda.

K
Bridges over the Ob River
Kirovsky District, Novosibirsk
Leninsky District, Novosibirsk
Oktyabrsky District, Novosibirsk
Bridges completed in 1955